3D Tetris is a 1996 puzzle video game developed by T&E Soft and published by Nintendo for the Virtual Boy. It was released on March 22, 1996, in North America. Players control multiple falling blocks, rotating and positioning them to clear layers in a three-dimensional environment similar to Tetriss gameplay. The game contains multiple modes and variations thereof, as well as different difficulty settings and levels. Parts of 3D Tetris are rendered as 3D wire-frame models. A version of the game entitled  was to be released in February 1996 in Japanese markets, but was never released. The game received mostly negative reviews with critics panning it for a lack of originality.

Gameplay

3D Tetris is a puzzle game that uses a three-dimensional playing field as opposed to the traditional two dimensions used in most other versions of Tetris. The play field, called a well, contains 5 vertical layers that players fill with falling three-dimensional blocks. These blocks can be rotated horizontally and vertically, as well as positioned in four different directions. Each block displays a shadow underneath it which indicates where it will land. The game's camera continually adjusts itself, but players can manually readjust it. The HUD displays a radar which provides information about each of the well's five layers, as well as the next block to fall, which is represented by a character. The game contains multiple different modes: 3-D Tetris, Center-Fill, and Puzzle, each having variations in how they play. Players can modify the difficulty in these modes as well as the rate by which the blocks fall.

In the 3-D Tetris mode, a layer disappears when it's filled with blocks, scoring players points which are displayed in the HUD. If blocks stack over the top of the well, the number of layers will go down by one. The game is over when the final layer is lost. One game mode is based on accumulating points, while the other mode requires players to complete multiple levels by clearing all five layers in each. In the Center-Fill mode, players place blocks in symmetrical patterns around center blocks placed in each well's layers. If a block is placed in a layer's center block, it disappears, and any other blocks in the layer will also disappear, if they have been successfully placed in a symmetrical pattern. Points are gained based on the number of blocks in, the complexity of, and the height of the symmetrical layer. A symmetrical pattern is indicated by a symbol shown in the HUD's radar, as well as the player's score. Like the 3-D Tetris mode, layers will be lost if the blocks go over the top of the well, and the game ends when all layers are lost. One variant requires players to complete as many layers as possible, while the other is the same except with obstacles added. The variant Clear It! requires players to clear ten symmetrical layers on each stage to progress to the next stage. In the Puzzle mode, a shape is displayed in the well at the beginning of each stage. Players are tasked with getting to the highest stage possible by placing blocks in the displayed shape to progress to the next stage. At the end of each stage, a stage-ending animation is displayed. If an incorrect shape is placed, the game ends. 3D Tetris includes an option to save high scores and names entered from the 3-D Tetris and Center-Fill modes, along with progress in the Puzzle mode, to a battery backup.

Development and release
3D Tetris was developed by T&E Soft and published by Nintendo in North America. A version was planned for Japanese markets entitled Polygo Block, which was to be released in February 1996, but was never released. Like all other Virtual Boy games, 3D Tetris uses a red-and-black color scheme and uses parallax, an optical trick that is used to simulate a 3D effect. The game contains 30 different block types, and renders each one as a 3D wire-frame model until they fall to the bottom of the well, where they are filled in. It was the last game released on the Virtual Boy in North America.

Reception

3D Tetris received mostly negative reviews. Aaron Curtiss, writing for the Los Angeles Times, said that 3D Tetris adds nothing to the Tetris experience and leaves players feeling "cheated." He criticized the control scheme and brushed off the 3D effects as superfluous. Staff for Entertainment Weekly had even harsher criticism, criticizing it as "eye-straining" and comparing it unfavorably to the video game Blockout. A reviewer for Next Generation panned the game, feeling that it demonstrates the inherent issues of the Virtual Boy. He found all of the different game modes to be poor reworkings of the Tetris concept, lacking the series' "simple elegance" while being harmed by the 3D perspective. A reviewer for the magazine VideoGames also found that the game was less appealing than Tetris due to the 3D perspective, though felt that the perspective did have value and was executed well. GamePros "Scary Larry" found the sound and visuals nondescript and the controls frustrating, though he still felt it was addictive. Staff for Game Informer felt the idea of a 3D Tetris had potential, but it was not executed well, criticizing its slow pace. A writer for Nintendo Power felt its button configurations were user-friendly and made it "easy to master."

In a retrospective review, USgamer writer Jaz Rignall was highly critical, comparing it to getting pepper sprayed. GamesRadar+ editor Brett Elston felt that 3D Tetris visuals were "appalling" and found it hard to tell what was happening as a result. Echoing Entertainment Weekly, writer Jeremy Parish found it to be a knockoff of Blockout; he criticized its visuals and gameplay for failing to find a middleground between too complex and too slow. Mark Long, CEO of Zombie Studios, preferred 3D Tetris to Tetris on the Game Boy, regarding it as the best game on the Virtual Boy. Dave Frear of Nintendo Life felt that it was boring if one starts at level 1 difficulty, but that starting from a higher difficulty makes it much more fun.

See also
List of Virtual Boy games

Notes

References

External links
 

1996 video games
Nintendo games
North America-exclusive video games
T&E Soft games
Tetris
Virtual Boy games
Single-player video games
Puzzle video games
Video games developed in Japan